Parliamentary elections were held in Finland on 15 and 16 March 1970.

Background
Mauno Koivisto had replaced Rafael Paasio as leader of the Social Democratic Party and Prime Minister in March 1968. His government was very broad-based, including the Social Democrats, the Centre Party, the Finnish People's Democratic League, the Swedish People's Party and the Social Democratic Union of Workers and Smallholders, with over four-fifths of MPs belonging to the governing parties. Koivisto's government implemented some liberal reforms, including the sale of medium-strength beer in grocery stores and kiosks, and abortion on demand (allowed also for social reasons, in addition to medical ones). The government helped the Finnish economy to grow by pursuing its predecessor's policies of subsidising export companies and fixed-term public works or government-funded jobs.

Centralized incomes agreements between the employers' organizations, labour unions and government became a part of the Finnish "consensus" (broad agreement) politics. On the other hand, quickly proceeding urbanization and industrialization caused many young people and young adults to leave from the countryside, and tens of thousands of Finns moved to Sweden in pursuit of a higher standard of living. Smallholders were severely affected, particularly in eastern and northern Finland. The populist Finnish Rural Party benefited from this discontent, and its charismatic leader, former Assistant Finance Minister and presidential candidate Veikko Vennamo accused the "old parties" of deliberately worsening the farmers' living standards, emptying the countryside and appeasing the Soviet Union too much by, for example, discouraging its open criticism in the Finnish political debate and media.

The increasing mocking and criticism of Christianity, traditional family values, patriotism, army and military service, and parents' and teachers' authority also helped the Rural Party and the National Coalition Party to score big gains in the elections.  The opposition parties were irritated by the student radicals' "conquest" of the Old University Students' House in Helsinki in November 1968. Koivisto's government suffered heavy losses, totalling over 20 MPs, but it still had a majority. President Urho Kekkonen allowed the National Coalition Party's leader Juha Rihtniemi to try to form a new government.  He was unable to form a majority government, and Kekkonen refused to allow him to form a minority centre-right government, claiming that such a government would fail in foreign policy (in other words, it would not gain the Soviet Union's trust).  From May to July 1970, the Liberal city manager of Helsinki, Teuvo Aura, led a caretaker government.  Long-time Foreign Minister Ahti Karjalainen managed to form a new centre-left majority government in July 1970, which excluded the National Coalition Party and Rural Party from power.  One notable demographic change of these parliamentary elections was the election of several young (under 30-year-old) MPs reflecting the rising political activity of young Finns (the baby boomers), and the lowering of minimum voting age to 20 years.

Results

References

General elections in Finland
Finland
Parliament
Finland
Election and referendum articles with incomplete results